Mahendrasinh Rana was an Indian National Congress politician, who later defected to the Bharatiya Janata Party. He was the first mayor of Gandhinagar.

See also
 Gandhinagar Municipal Corporation
 Bharatiya Janata Party

References

Living people
Mayors of places in Gujarat
People from Gandhinagar
Indian National Congress politicians
Bharatiya Janata Party politicians from Gujarat
Year of birth missing (living people)